Bucking the Barrier is a 1923 American drama film directed by Colin Campbell and written by John Stone. The film stars Dustin Farnum, Arline Pretty, Léon Bary, Colin Chase, Hayford Hobbs and Sidney D'Albrook. The film was released on April 1, 1923, by Fox Film Corporation.

Cast           
Dustin Farnum as Kit Carew
Arline Pretty as Blanche Cavendish
Léon Bary as Luke Cavendish
Colin Chase as Frank Farfax
Hayford Hobbs as Cyril Cavendish
Sidney D'Albrook as Tyson

References

External links
 

1923 films
1920s English-language films
Silent American drama films
1923 drama films
Fox Film films
Films directed by Colin Campbell
American silent feature films
American black-and-white films
1920s American films